Color Me Barbra is the seventh studio album by singer Barbra Streisand released on Columbia Records in 1966. It reached number 3 in the US albums chart and was certified Gold by the RIAA. It was also the title of Streisand's second CBS TV special on March 30, 1966 and the first in color when it was still a novelty for TV, hence the title.

Track listing
Side one
 "Yesterdays" (Otto Harbach, Jerome Kern) – 3:05
 "One Kiss" (Oscar Hammerstein II, Sigmund Romberg) – 2:11
 "The Minute Waltz" (Lan O'Kun, Frédéric Chopin) – 1:59
 "Gotta Move" (Peter Matz) – 2:01
 "Non C'est Rien" (Michel Jourdan, Armand Canfora) – 3:27
 "Where or When" (Lorenz Hart, Richard Rodgers) – 3:06

Side Two
<li> Medley – 9:00
 "Animal Crackers in My Soup"
 "Funny Face"
 "The Face"
 "They Didn't Believe Me"
 "Were Thine That Special Face"
 "I've Grown Accustomed to Her Face"
 "Let's Face the Music and Dance"
 "Sam, You Made the Pants Too Long"
 "What's New Pussycat?"
 "Small World"
 "I Love You"
 "I Stayed Too Long at the Fair"
 "Look at That Face"
 "C'est si Bon" (André Hornez, Jerry Seelen, Henri Betti) – 3:40
 "Where Am I Going?" (Dorothy Fields, Cy Coleman) – 2:50
 "Starting Here, Starting Now" (Richard Maltby, Jr., David Shire) – 2:53

DVD
 "Draw Me a Circle"
 "Yesterdays"
 "One Kiss"
 "The Minute Waltz"
 "Gotta Move"
 "Non c'est Rien"
 "Where or When"
 "Pets"
 "Animal Crackers in My Soup"
 "Funny Face"
 "The Face"
 "They Didn't Believe Me"
 "Were Thine That Special Face"
 "I've Grown Accustomed to Her Face"
 "Let's Face the Music and Dance"
 "Sam, You Made the Pants Too Long"
 "What's New Pussycat?"
 "Who's Afraid of the Big Bad Wolf?"
 "Small World"
 "Try to Remember"
 "Spring Again"
 "I Stayed Too Long at the Fair"
 "Look at That Face"
 "Any Place I Hang My Hat Is Home"
 "It Had to Be You"
 "C'est si bon"
 "Where Am I Going?"
 "Starting Here, Starting Now"

Singles
 "Where Am I Going?" / "You Wanna Bet" 1966 
 "Sam, You Made the Pants Too Long" / "The Minute Waltz" 1966 
 "Non C'est Rien" / "Le Mur" 1966

Accolades
Color Me Barbra received Grammy Award nominations for Album of the Year and for Best Female Vocal Performance.

Charts

Certifications

References

External links
 Color Me Barbra at Internet Movie Database

Barbra Streisand albums
1966 albums
Albums arranged by Don Costa
Albums arranged by Michel Legrand
Albums arranged by Peter Matz
Albums conducted by Don Costa
Albums conducted by Michel Legrand
Albums conducted by Peter Matz
Columbia Records albums